Ahmad Ahi (born 1985) is an Iranian footballer who currently plays for Sepidrood in the Iran's Premier Football League.

Club career
Ahi started his career with Persepolis Academy. In 2006, he was promoted to the first team but never played a game. In summer 2011 he joined Malavan and was given the #26 jersey. After Alireza Jarahkar was injured, he was used as a regular player, and the club extended his contract for another two years in summer 2012.

Statistics

International
He invited Team Melli in April 2012 by Carlos Queiroz after injury of Siamak Kouroshi, former Naft Tehran F.C. defender. He made his debut for national team in 3–0 victory against Mozambique while he used as a substitute.

References

External links
 Ahmad Ahi at Persianleague.com
 

1985 births
Living people
Iranian footballers
Iran international footballers
Persepolis F.C. players
Malavan players
Association football defenders